Rachel Attituq Qitsualik-Tinsley is a Canadian writer. She was a winner of the Burt Award for First Nations, Métis and Inuit Literature in 2015 for Skraelings, which she cowrote with her husband Sean Qitsualik-Tinsley. The book was also a shortlisted finalist for the Governor General's Award for English-language children's literature at the 2014 Governor General's Awards.

The duo also cowrote the 2008 book Qanuq Pinngurnirmata, a volume of Inuit mythology. The book was reissued in 2015 as How Things Came to Be: Inuit Stories of Creation.

She works as an Inuktitut language translator, and has written both non-fiction and short stories about Inuit culture. In 2012, she was awarded the Queen Elizabeth II Diamond Jubilee Medal for her writing.

In 2017, she ran as a candidate in the Nunavut territorial election for the electoral district of Quttiktuq. Qitsualik-Tinsley finished in last place in her riding, with 0 votes.

Publications

References

External links

Rachel and Sean Qitsualik-Tinsley at Inhabit Media

21st-century Canadian novelists
Canadian women novelists
Inuit writers
Living people
Canadian writers of young adult literature
Writers from Nunavut
21st-century Canadian women writers
Women writers of young adult literature
21st-century Canadian translators
Canadian Inuit women
Women in Nunavut politics
Year of birth missing (living people)
Inuit from the Northwest Territories
Inuit from Nunavut
Canadian women non-fiction writers
People from Qikiqtaaluk Region